Larry David Salmans (November 17, 1937 – January 23, 2022) was an American politician.

Salmans was born in Shamrock, Texas, and raised in Hanston, Kansas. He graduated from Baylor University with a double major in psychology and biology in 1960. Salmans served in the United States Air Force from 1960 until 1969. He worked in the bank business, farming, and as a forensic psychologist in Hanston, Kansas. He served on the local school board in Hanston, Kansas. Salmans then served in the Kansas Senate from 1997 to 2005 and was a Republican. He died in Waco, Texas.

References

1937 births
2022 deaths
People from Hodgeman County, Kansas
People from Shamrock, Texas
Military personnel from Kansas
Military personnel from Texas
Baylor University alumni
School board members in Kansas
Republican Party Kansas state senators